Anurag Srivastava  is an Indian civil servant who belongs to the Indian Foreign Service cadre. He served as spokesperson of the Ministry of External Affairs, India.

Previously he was the Ambassador of India to Ethiopia and African Union.

Early life
Srivastava holds a bachelor's degree in Engineering from Malaviya National Institute of Technology, Jaipur in 1993 and has a master's degree in Business Administration and also holds a Postgraduate Diploma in Diplomatic Studies from the University of Oxford, United Kingdom. He joined the Indian Foreign Service in 1999.

Career
Srivastava served at India's Permanent Mission to the United Nations (UN) in Geneva where his works are related to human rights, refugee issues and trade policy. 
Before he was appointed as Indian Ambassador to Ethiopia, Srivastava was heading the Finance Division of the Ministry of External Affairs (MEA), Government of India, which is tasked to administer its annual budget of about US$2 billion. He was head of the political wing at the Indian high commission in Sri Lanka and was closely involved in India's development assistance projects. Sri Lanka He has also held different positions in MEA at its headquarters in New Delhi, including in the Pakistan-Afghanistan-Iran division and in the External Publicity Division. In September 2016, he was accredited as the Indian ambassador to the Republic of Djibouti.

References

External links 
 Anurag Srivastava – Profile

Ambassadors of India to Ethiopia
Living people
Indian Foreign Service officers
Year of birth missing (living people)